The Châu Đốc River is a river of Vietnam and Cambodia.

From its source in Takéo Province in Cambodia, the river drains southerly, crossing into Vietnam's An Giang Province then joining the Bassac River at Châu Đốc.

References

Rivers of An Giang province
Rivers of Cambodia
Rivers of Vietnam